Anna Olsson (born 14 March 1964 in Timrå) is a Swedish sprint canoeist who competed from the mid-1980s to the early 2000s (decade). Competing in five Summer Olympics, she won four medals with one gold (1984: K-2 500 m), one silver (1984: K-4 500 m), and two bronzes (1992 and 1996: both K-4 500 m).

Olsson also won eight medals at the ICF Canoe Sprint World Championships with a gold (K-2 500 m: 1993), three silvers (K-1 200 m: 1994, K-1 500 m: 1993, K-4 500 m: 1993) and four bronzes (K-1 200 m: 1995, K-2 500 m: 1991, K-4 200 m: 1995, K-4 500 m: 1994).

References
Database Olympics

1964 births
Living people
People from Timrå Municipality
Canoeists at the 1984 Summer Olympics
Canoeists at the 1988 Summer Olympics
Canoeists at the 1992 Summer Olympics
Canoeists at the 1996 Summer Olympics
Canoeists at the 2000 Summer Olympics
Olympic canoeists of Sweden
Olympic gold medalists for Sweden
Olympic silver medalists for Sweden
Olympic bronze medalists for Sweden
Swedish female canoeists
Olympic medalists in canoeing
ICF Canoe Sprint World Championships medalists in kayak
Medalists at the 1996 Summer Olympics
Medalists at the 1992 Summer Olympics
Medalists at the 1984 Summer Olympics
Sportspeople from Västernorrland County